Edward Scott Bozek (November 20, 1950 – January 7, 2022), also known as Scotty Bozek, was an American épée fencer. He competed at the 1972 and 1976 Summer Olympics. 

Bozek earned a degree in Russian Studies from the University of Massachusetts in Boston  in 1972. He earned a masters in international affairs in Central and Eastern European Studies from  Columbia University. He also studied at the National Defense University (the Industrial College of the Armed Forces), and earned another masters in national resource strategy in 1999.

Bozek competed at the 1971 and 1975 Pan American Games, winning gold medals both years in team épée and a silver medal in 1971 in individual épée. He was US Champion in épée in 1973 and 1975.

Bozek died on January 7, 2022, at the age of 71.

See also
List of USFA Division I National Champions

References

External links
 

1950 births
2022 deaths
American male épée fencers
Olympic fencers of the United States
Fencers at the 1972 Summer Olympics
Fencers at the 1976 Summer Olympics
Sportspeople from Salem, Massachusetts
Pan American Games medalists in fencing
Pan American Games gold medalists for the United States
Pan American Games silver medalists for the United States
Fencers at the 1975 Pan American Games
Fencers at the 1979 Pan American Games
Medalists at the 1971 Pan American Games
Medalists at the 1975 Pan American Games
20th-century American people
21st-century American people